Recreation Park was a baseball park in Philadelphia.

The ballpark was the first home of the Philadelphia Phillies of the National League during the years 1883–1886, prior to the opening of the ballpark that became known as Baker Bowl.

The park was bounded by 24th Street (east, first base); Ridge Avenue (north, right field); Montgomery Avenue (northwest, center field); 25th Street (west, left field); and Columbia Avenue (south, third base) (which in 1987 was renamed  Cecil B. Moore Avenue after the civil-rights leader).  The park was not the only one in the area; 14 years later, Columbia Park, the first home of the Philadelphia Athletics, opened eight blocks to the west on Columbia Avenue, across the avenue to the south.

1860 to 1882

The field was used at least as early as June 16, 1860, when Equity defeated Pennsylvania 65-52 in what author Charles Peverelly, writing about "the national game", called the "first baseball game played in Pennsylvania."

During the Civil War, a cavalry of the Union Army occupied the park. In 1866, with new houses bordering the field, a nine-foot fence was erected and the field was put back in shape for baseball. But it was poorly maintained by 1871 and used less and less.

The Philadelphia Centennials of the National Association leveled and resodded the field, built a 10-foot fence, clubhouse and grandstands in 1875. They called it Centennial Park. The team folded after just 14 games and the association followed at the end of the season. With no tenant the park fell into disrepair.

During the 1876-1879 period, the lot was used as a horse market. Local newspapers referred to its location variously as Ridge and 23rd, 24th or 25th. Most of the time it was given as 24th.

Philadelphia Phillies (1883-1886)
Alfred J. Reach acquired a five-year lease on the horse market property in 1882, renaming it "Recreation Park". He cleared the grounds, resodded the field, built a three-section wooden grandstand, and fielded the independent team called "Fillies." The next year, Philadelphia joined the National League.

The Phillies played their first game ever on April 2, 1883 and defeated the amateur Manayunk Ashlands by the score of 11-0 at Recreation Park.

Once the lease had expired following the 1886 season, the club moved into their own new facility, Philadelphia Baseball Park, which they would call home for the next  years.

There is no historical marker or any indication that a ballpark once stood on this site. As of October 2015, a mini market stands on the corner where home plate was located, and urban housing occupies the area.

References

External links 
Only known photo of Recreation Park
1887 birds-eye map showing Jefferson Street grounds and Recreation Park

Defunct sports venues in Philadelphia
Defunct baseball venues in the United States
Philadelphia Phillies stadiums
Baseball venues in Pennsylvania